The citron-throated toucan (Ramphastos citreolaemus) is a near-passerine bird in the family Ramphastidae, the toucans, toucanets, and aracaris. It is found in Colombia and Venezuela.

Taxonomy and systematics

The citron-throated toucan is treated as a species by the International Ornithological Committee (IOC) and BirdLife International's Handbook of the Birds of the World. However, the South American Classification Committee of the American Ornithological Society and the Clements taxonomy treat it as a subspecies of the channel-billed toucan (R. vitellinus). The citron-throated toucan is monotypic.

Description

The sexes are alike. Their bill is mostly black. It has a narrow greenish-yellow culmen, a wide yellow band at the base of the maxilla, and a blue-green base to the mandible. The eye is surrounded by bare pale blue skin. Most of the plumage is black. The rump, uppertail coverts, throat, and breast are pale lemon yellow with a narrow red band below the breast. The undertail coverts are red.

Distribution and habitat

The citron-throated toucan is found from northern Colombia into northwestern Venezuela. It inhabits mature humid forest in the lowlands and foothills.

Behavior

Movement

As far as is known, the citron-throated toucan is a year-round resident throughout its range.

Feeding

The citron-throated toucan typically forages from the forest mid-storey to its canopy but will pick up fallen fruit from the ground. Its diet is primarily a wide variety of fruits and also includes insects and other arthropods, lizards, and birds and their eggs.

Breeding

The citron-throated toucan's breeding season appears to include at least January to July. Its breeding biology is assumed to be similar to that of the channel-billed toucan but no studies have been made.

Vocal and non-vocal sounds

The citron-throated toucan is one of the "croaker" group of toucans. Its song is a "series of frog-like, croaking 'cree-op' notes".

Status

The IUCN has assessed the citron-throated toucan as being of Least Concern. It has a large range, but its population size is not known and is believed to be decreasing. No immediate threats have been identified. It is considered uncommon in Colombia, where it occurs in several protected areas. It is considered scarce and local in Venezuela "where its Andean foothill habitat around [the Lake] Maracaibo basin is fast disappearing".

References

citron-throated toucan
Birds of Colombia
Birds of Venezuela
citron-throated toucan